The 1992–93 Football League season was Birmingham City Football Club's 90th in the Football League. They competed in the second tier of English football, renamed Division One following the Premier League's split from the Football League. They were promoted to Division One in 1991–92, and finished in 19th position in the 24-team division, avoiding relegation back to the third tier on the final day of the season. They lost in their opening first-round matches in both the 1992–93 FA Cup and the League Cup, and were eliminated at the group stage of the Anglo-Italian Cup.

The club's top league scorers were Paul Peschisolido and Andy Saville with seven goals. If goals in all competitions are counted, the top scorer was John Frain with eight.

Off the field, the collapse of the Bank of Credit and Commerce International (BCCI) put the club owners' business into receivership; in November 1992 BCCI's liquidator put up for sale their 84% holding in the football club. The club continued in administration for four months, until Sport Newspapers proprietor David Sullivan bought it for £700,000. He installed the 23-year-old Karren Brady as managing director and Jack Wiseman remained as chairman. Manager Terry Cooper was given money for signings, and on the last day of the season, the team avoided relegation back to the third tier.

Football League Division One

Match details

League table (part)

FA Cup

League Cup

Anglo-Italian Cup

Appearances and goals

Numbers in parentheses denote appearances as substitute.
Players with name struck through and marked  left the club during the playing season.
Players with names in italics and marked * were on loan from another club for the whole of their season with Birmingham.

See also
Birmingham City F.C. seasons

References
General
 
 
 Source for match dates, league positions and results: 
 Source for league positions: select date required via dropdown menu: 
 Source for lineups, appearances, goalscorers and attendances: Matthews (2010), Complete Record, pp. 420–21, 477.

Specific

Birmingham City F.C. seasons
Birmingham City